Porlajee "Billy" Rakchongcharoen, a Karen environmental and community activist, was last seen alive in Kaeng Krachan National Park, western Phetchaburi Province, Thailand on 17 April 2014. He was arrested at a park checkpoint by park superintendent Chaiwat Limlikitaksorn and four of his men for alleged illegally collecting wild honey in the forest. Three years earlier, in 2011, Billy had filed a lawsuit against Chaiwat over the May 2011 destruction and burning of houses, and eviction of over 20 Karen families living in Jai Paen Din, meaning 'heart of the land' in the park's Pong Luk Bang Kloy village, in the Huai Mae Phriang Sub-district of Kaeng Krachan District. The national park chief later swore that Billy had been arrested and released on the same day after being questioned for possession of an illegal wild bee honeycomb and six bottles of honey. There are no official records of his arrest or detention. Following Billy's supposed arrest he was never seen alive again. Searches conducted from April–August 2019 discovered human bone fragments in the Kaeng Krachan Dam reservoir. DNA tests of the fragments matched those conducted on Billy's mother, leading the Department of Special Investigation (DSI) to conclude that the bones were Billy's and that he had been murdered. Chaiwat, the former park chief, immediately cast doubt on the DNA test, saying, "...this [DNA test result] is not enough proof to conclusively say the skull fragment is Billy's,..." Chaiwat and others had been charged with Billy's murder

Background
Kaeng Krachan forest has been the ancestral home to tribes of ethnic Karen peoples. Billy's village was shown on military maps dating from 1912, long before the forest became a national park in 1981. In 1979, the Thai government designated areas of the forest as "protected", forcing the Karen to leave their homes. Authorities insisted that the Karen crop rotation system was a threat to the forest ecosystem. Chaiwat called the villagers recent invaders, a haven for smugglers, and a threat to national security. In May 2011, Kaeng Krachan National Park officers forcibly evicted and burned about 100 houses and rice barns of Karen villagers in Pong Luk Bang Kloy. The evictions occurred the same year the forest agency moved to list the Kaeng Krachan Forest Complex as a UNESCO World Heritage Site. On 11 September 2011, Phetchaburi local activist and former Pheu Thai candidate Thatkamon Ob-om, 55, was shot dead while driving. He had been active in helping the Karen people who were evicted. As a result, had been banned from entering the park for causing unrest and impeding development. Thatkamon had accused Chaiwat of forest encroachment and backed a forest dwellers lawsuit against the park superintendent. Chaiwat was charged with murder, but was freed for lack of evidence.

Investigation and legal proceedings
Shortly after Billy's disappearance, his wife, Pinnapha Phrueksapan, requested that the court hold an emergency trial under Article 90 of the Criminal Procedure Code to investigate his alleged unlawful detention. The Court of First Instance ruled that evidence of the unlawful detention of Billy was insufficient. Royal Thai Police Region 7 investigators filed charges in early–2015 under Article 157 of the Criminal Code, "malfeasance in office", against Chaiwat and four other park officers for the alleged unlawful detention of Billy.

After two years, the investigation of Billy's disappearance had made no progress. Thailand has no forced disappearance laws, so Karen villagers filed a lawsuit against the alleged perpetrators for unlawfully detaining the activist. On 17 April 2016, at Kaeng Krachan District Police Station, Phetchaburi Province, villagers from the Karen Network for Culture and Environment filed a complaint against Chaiwat Limlikitaksorn, former Superintendent of Kaeng Krachan National Park. He and his four colleagues were alleged to have been involved in the disappearance of Porlajee. The case is under investigation by several agencies, but no progress has been made on the case.

In June 2018 the Supreme Administrative Court reaffirmed that ethnic Karen villagers cannot return to their homes in Kaeng Krachan National Park. Their houses were burned down by park officials in 2011. The court noted that villagers did not have ownership documents for the land they were evicted from making them ineligible to claim ownership or return to live there. The villagers argued that their families had lived in the park for over a century, long before the forest was made a national park in 1979. The court did find former park chief Chaiwat Limlikit-aksorn guilty of malfeasance for torching over 100 Karen houses. He was ordered to pay damages of 50,000 baht on average to each of the six plaintiffs within 30 days of the ruling.

On 28 June 2018, the Department of Special Investigation (DSI) announced that it will re-open the investigation into Billy's disappearance. Media reports intimated that the DSI's change of heart was due to pressure on the Prayut Chan-o-cha administration from international organizations regarding a case that was initially ignored, leading the media to doubt DSI's newfound commitment. The Bangkok Post called DSI's newfound interest in the case, "...a ceremonial move to appease international human rights defenders." Earlier in June, the Supreme Administrative Court found former park official Chaiwat guilty of malfeasance for setting fire to more than 100 Karen houses in the park. He was ordered to pay compensation of about 50,000 baht per house to six plaintiffs. In the same ruling, the court said the displaced ethnic Karen could not return to their homes in the park because they did not possess property deeds. The International Commission of Jurists (ICJ), an international human rights non-governmental organisation, on 26 July 2018, urged the DSI to expedite their latest investigation. The ICJ charged that the case was moving at a "glacial pace" before the DSI accepted it.

Seeing justice done in Billy's case may prove elusive. Thailand does not have a law on enforced disappearances which would hold accountable the person last seen with the victim. In 2018, the junta-appointed National Legislative Assembly defeated a bill against torture and enforced disappearance.

Timeline

In popular culture
Independent film director Pimpaka Towira produced a 30-minute film entitled, The Purple Kingdom, inspired by Billy's disappearance. The film appeared in 2016, but has not been screened widely. Pimpaka says she became aware of Billy through his short movie The Way of Lives, which tells the story of Karen villagers living in Kaeng Krachan National Park's Bangkloi community. The film draws attention to inequalities in Thai society by comparing two women whose husbands have gone missing. While Namthip, the fictional name of Billy's wife in the film, is treated indifferently by authorities when she tries to file a missing persons report with the police, Woon, the fictional wife in the parallel story, is enthusiastically aided by police in finding her husband who was killed in a helicopter crash in the jungle. In real life, it took Pinnapa "Minor" Pruksapan, Billy's real-world wife, more than four years to convince authorities to begin an investigation into Billy's disappearance. "Is it because I'm poor and don't have any money to pay them so the officials are not interested in helping me?", she asks.

Related cases
Billy is not the only Thai activist to have disappeared or been harmed under mysterious circumstances. , according to the UN, there were 82 cases of forced disappearance alone documented in Thailand. According to Amnesty Thailand, at least 59 human-rights defenders have been victims of forced disappearance since 1998. 

In 2013, the Bangkok Post reported that Police General Vasit Dejkunjorn, founder of the Thai Spring movement, told a seminar that forced disappearance is a tool which corrupt state power uses to eliminate individuals deemed a threat.

 Tanong Po-arn, President of the Labour Congress of Thailand (disappeared 1991)
 Charoen Wat-aksorn
 Prawet Prapanukul
 Wutthipong "Ko Tee" Kochathmmakun
 Den Khamlae, Khok Yao land rights activist, disappeared mid-April 2016.
Somchai Neelapaijit, human rights activist and Chairman, Muslim Lawyers Association (disappeared 2004)

See also
Forced disappearances#Thailand
Human rights in Thailand
Lists of people who disappeared

References

2014 murders in Thailand
2010s missing person cases
Porlajee Rakchongcharoen, Murder of
Porlajee Rakchongcharoen, Murder of